San Juan del Flumen is a locality located in the municipality of Sariñena, in Huesca province, Aragon, Spain. As of 2020, it has a population of 349.

Geography 
San Juan del Flumen is located 71km south-southeast of Huesca.

References

Populated places in the Province of Huesca